Stéphane Bohli was the defending champion, but decided not to participate.

Unseeded Fabrice Martin won the title, beating 4th seed Kenny de Schepper 6–1, 6–7(6–8), 7–6(7–3) in the final.

Seeds

Draw

Finals

Top half

Bottom half

References
 Main Draw
 Qualifying Draw

Guzzini Challenger - Singles
Guzzini Challenger